Zoanthus kuroshio is a zoanthid first described from southern Japan.

References

Further reading
Reimer, James Davis, et al. "High levels of morphological variation despite close genetic relatedness between Zoanthus aff. vietnamensis and Zoanthus kuroshio (Anthozoa: Hexacorallia)." Zoological Science 23.9 (2006): 755-761.
Reimer, James Davis. "Preliminary survey of zooxanthellate zoanthid diversity (Hexacorallia: Zoantharia) from southern Shikoku, Japan." Kuroshio Biosphere3 (2007): 1-16.
Reimer, James Davis, et al. "Molecular evidence suggesting interspecific hybridization in Zoanthus spp.(Anthozoa: Hexacorallia)." Zoological Science24.4 (2007): 346-359.

External links

WORMS

Animals described in 2006
Zoanthus